The following highways are numbered 72:

International
 Asian Highway 72
 European route E72

Australia
 Snowy Mountains Highway

Canada
 Alberta Highway 72
 Newfoundland and Labrador Route 72
 Highway 72 (Ontario)

China 
  G72 Expressway

Iran
 Road 72

Italy
 State road 72

Korea, South
National Route 72

New Zealand
 Inland Scenic Route

United States
 Interstate 72
 U.S. Route 72
 Alabama State Route 72
 Arizona State Route 72
 Arkansas Highway 72
 California State Route 72
 Colorado State Highway 72
 Connecticut Route 72
 Delaware Route 72
 Florida State Road 72
 Georgia State Route 72
 Georgia State Route 72 (1930–1941) (former)
 Hawaii Route 72
 Idaho State Highway 72
 Illinois Route 72
 Kentucky Route 72
 Louisiana Highway 72
 Louisiana State Route 72 (former)
 Maryland Route 72 (former)
 M-72 (Michigan highway)
 Minnesota State Highway 72
 County Road 72 (Ramsey County, Minnesota)
 Missouri Route 72
 Montana Highway 72
 Nebraska Highway 72 (former)
 Nevada State Route 72 (former)
 New Jersey Route 72
 County Route 72 (Bergen County, New Jersey)
 County Route 72 (Ocean County, New Jersey)
 New Mexico State Road 72
 New York State Route 72
 County Route 72 (Cattaraugus County, New York)
 County Route 72 (Chautauqua County, New York)
 County Route 72 (Dutchess County, New York)
 County Route 72 (Essex County, New York)
 County Route 72 (Jefferson County, New York)
 County Route 72 (Livingston County, New York)
 County Route 72 (Madison County, New York)
 County Route 72 (Montgomery County, New York)
 County Route 72 (Orange County, New York)
 County Route 72 (Putnam County, New York)
 County Route 72 (Rockland County, New York)
 County Route 72 (Suffolk County, New York)
 North Carolina Highway 72
 Ohio State Route 72
 Oklahoma State Highway 72
 Oklahoma State Highway 72 (1930s) (former)
 Pennsylvania Route 72
 South Carolina Highway 72
 Tennessee State Route 72
 Texas State Highway 72
 Texas State Highway Spur 72
 Farm to Market Road 72
 Texas Park Road 72
 Utah State Route 72
 Virginia State Route 72
 West Virginia Route 72
 Wisconsin Highway 72
 Wyoming Highway 72

Territories
 U.S. Virgin Islands Highway 72

See also
List of highways numbered 72A
A72 (disambiguation)